Ectoplasm (also exoplasm) (from the ancient Greek words ἐκτός (èktòs): outside and πλάσμα: plasma, literally meaning: that which has form) is the non-granulated outer part of a cell's cytoplasm, while endoplasm is its often  granulated inner layer. It is clear, and protects as well as transports things within the cell. Moreover, large numbers of actin filaments frequently occur in the ectoplasm, which form an elastic support for the cell membrane.

It contains actin and myosin microfilaments.

See also
 Cytoplasm
 Endoplasm

References

Cell anatomy